MS Cruise Sardegna is a cruiseferry owned and operated by Grimaldi Group. Previously was operated by Minoan Lines under the name Cruise Olympia. It was built at Fincantieri in Castellammare di Stabia, Italy.

She was the fourth and last of a series of four sister ships, the others being Cruise Roma, Cruise Barcelona (both operated by Grimaldi Lines) and Cruise Europa (operated by Minoan Lines). They are the largest ferries under Italian flag. Cruise Olympia and Cruise Europa are distinguished from Cruise Roma and Cruise Barcelona by a slightly different arrangement of the accommodation and interiors, enabling them to carry a larger number of passengers.

The ship has 413 cabins, including 68 suites, one à la carte restaurant, one self-service restaurant, a conference room, a fast food, a dog kennel, a boutique, a swimming pool, a disco, a casino, a shopping center and an internet café.

Cruise Olympia previously operated by Minoan Lines on the route linking Ancona, Italy to Patras, Greece via Igoumenitsa; she makes the passage in 22 hours.
In February 2021 Grimaldi Group announced that Cruise Olympia and Cruise Europa will be transferred at Grimaldi Group. The first renamed Cruise Sardegna and the second one will remain with her name. Cruise Olympia left Greece on 4 February and arrived in Malta, Palumbo shipyards the next day. There will put her new signals and her new name.

See also
Largest ferries of Europe

References

External links
 

Ferries of Italy
Cruiseferries
Ships built in Castellammare di Stabia
2009 ships
Ships built by Fincantieri